Laxdale is a village in the Scottish Outer Hebrides, on the Isle of Lewis. Although nominally a distinct village, Laxdale is now effectively a suburb of Stornoway. Laxdale is also within the parish of Stornoway. There is a school called Laxdale School. The Abhainn Lacasdail or Laxdale River passes along the northern side of Laxdale. The A857 runs through Laxdale, from Stornoway to Port of Ness.

See also 

 Lewis and Harris
 History of the Outer Hebrides

References 

Villages in the Isle of Lewis